Karin Ingrid Lamberg-Skog (born 17 January 1961 in Uppsala) is a Swedish former cross-country skier who competed during the 1980s. She won a bronze medal in the 4 × 5 km relay at the 1987 FIS Nordic World Ski Championships in Oberstdorf and finished 18th in the 10 km event at those championships.

Lamberg-Skog's best individual finish at the Winter Olympics was 16th in the 5 km event at Sarajevo in 1984. Her best career individual finish was fifth in a 10 km event in Finland in 1988.

Cross-country skiing results
All results are sourced from the International Ski Federation (FIS).

Olympic Games

World Championships
 1 medals – (1 bronze)

World Cup

Season standings

Team podiums

 1 victory
 5 podiums

Note:   Until the 1999 World Championships, World Championship races were included in the World Cup scoring system.

References

External links

World Championship results 
Women's 4 x 5 km cross-country relay Olympic results: 1976-2002 

1961 births
Living people
Sportspeople from Uppsala
Cross-country skiers from Uppsala County
Olympic cross-country skiers of Sweden
Cross-country skiers at the 1980 Winter Olympics
Cross-country skiers at the 1984 Winter Olympics
Cross-country skiers at the 1988 Winter Olympics
Swedish female cross-country skiers
FIS Nordic World Ski Championships medalists in cross-country skiing